Sherwin Emmanuel (born 11 April 1986) is a Canadian born, Saint Lucian international footballer. Who plays as a Center Back  for Sporting Kristina, in the Kolmonen Finnish league.

Personal life
Emmanuel was born on 11 April 1986 in Scarborough, Toronto, Canada. His parents, Eustace and Lidwina Emmanuel both were from Saint Lucia. At the age of 12, he got selected to try out for the U-14 Ontario provincial team, Which ignited the flame of passion for soccer in Sherwin. That was where it all began for one young man with big dreams.

Early playing career
He began his football career at the U-14 Ontario provincial (east district) team. Although he didn't make that squad, he was determined to make it the following year through intense training and a determined spirit. The following months he got selected to play for a district team that played in a tournament against other districts.

To be selected for the under 13 Ontario provincial team, which he made and was honored to represent.  This team played in provincial tournaments as well as tournaments in Germany where they faced Bundesliga teams like U-15 FC Schalke 04 and VFB Stuttgart for example.

During his days in Canada under-17 soccer team, Sherwin has had the opportunity to play against many remarkable teams including USA, El Salvador, Guatemala, Mexico, Bermuda, Barbados, and Jamaica to name a few.

Club career
Emmanuel began playing at the youth level in 2010 with Csákvár FC, and later with Erin Mills SC. He later played in the Canadian Soccer League originally with Portugal FC (which is currently renamed as SC Toronto) in 2010, and the following season with the Mississauga Eagles FC.

In 2012, he played abroad in India with Kolkata-based club Southern Samity, that competed in the I-League 2nd Division. The following season he played in the National Premier Leagues South Australia with Adelaide Cobras FC. He would later spend time with Adelaide Raiders SC, and with Para Hills Knights SC.

In 2016, he moved to the League1 Ontario with Master's FA, where logged 1,706 minutes over 21 appearances, scoring one goal.

In 2017, he signed with the Swedish Division 3 side Råslätts SK and spent two seasons. In 2018, he returned to Australia to play with Adelaide Cobras. With Cobras, he appeared in nine league matches, scoring one goal.

In 2021, he played in the Finland’s Kolmonen league, for  Sporting Kristina. He signed for the last 5 games, which he played every game and helped them escape relegation.

International career 
In 2001, he was selected for the Canada men's national under-15 soccer team camp, and later was called by head coach Stephen Hart for the Canada men's national under-17 soccer team camp in 2002, and 2003.

Emmanuel was among 22 players, named to the squad for the 2019–20 CONCACAF Nations League B matches against Dominican Republic and Montserrat on 16 and 19 November 2019. He made his senior international debut for the Saint Lucia national football team on October 12, 2019, against the Dominican Republic in a 2019–20 CONCACAF Nations League B match, which ended as their 3–0 loss.

Managerial career 
In 2019, he became involved with Sole Soccer Camp as a trainer. He also serves as an academy coach for Dutch Connections FC Under 10 soccer program alongside the U11 team.

See also
 Saint Lucia international footballers

References

External links
 
 Sherwin Emmanuel at OPSM Pro
 
 
 

1986 births
Living people
Canadian soccer players
Saint Lucian footballers
Saint Lucia international footballers
SC Toronto players
Mississauga Eagles FC players
Southern Samity players
Adelaide Cobras FC players
Adelaide Raiders SC players
Canadian Soccer League (1998–present) players
I-League 2nd Division players
National Premier Leagues players
Division 3 (Swedish football) players
Sportspeople from Scarborough, Toronto
Soccer players from Toronto
Association football midfielders
Expatriate footballers in India
Master's FA players
Calcutta Football League players